Tower of Babel is a computer game for the Amiga, Atari ST and Acorn Archimedes systems programmed by Pete Cooke, developed by Rainbird Software and released by Microprose Software in 1989. It is a puzzle video game played on a three-dimensional tower-like grid viewed in vector graphics with filled polygons.

Background
The plot of the game is based on the biblical story of the Tower of Babel. At the height of the tower's construction, while it failed in its original purpose to directly contact God, it caught the attention of a passing Zantorian alien spaceship. The Zantorians descended and left three spider-like robots to help the Shinarians in constructing the tower. However, distrust broke out among the two species, and the humans betrayed the robots, stealing their energy packs (called "Klondikes"). Playing the robots, it is the player's job to find the energy packs to be able to get back home to Zantor.

Gameplay

The game play is purely puzzle-based. The famous Tower of Babel itself does not actually appear; instead there are several differently-configured 8*8*4 towers (four floors of 8*8 squares each).

The Zantorians robots are called the Grabber, the Pusher and the Zapper. Each of these has different abilities. The Grabber can collect Klondikes and operate various devices, the Pusher can push things further away, and the Zapper can destroy things. In a tower, players can be assigned any combination of these robots, depending on the tower's design. In each tower, the player's goal is either to destroy a set number of objects, collect a set number of Klondikes, or both. Towers with Klondikes to collect need the Grabber, but the other robots can sometimes be superfluous, and indeed, the destruction of these robots is sometimes necessary for the completion of a tower.

Everything in the game is viewed in a realistic 3D vector graphics view, but the actual movement in the game is far more contained than in games usually associated with such graphics, only allowing square-by-square movement in rectangular directions and vertical movement using special lifts.

Various devices, sentry mechanisms and autonomous robots also inhabit each tower. Some of these can be used to gain an advantage, while some hinder progress.

Editor
Tower of Babel also includes a construction kit where players can design their own towers and save them to disk for later play and distribution. The towers can be password-protected to avoid spoiling them by looking directly at the design.

One feature of the game is the ability to program the robots. Each robot can be given up to eight orders (for example: Forward, Forward, Left, Fire, Right, Forward). In some levels, programming the robots is mandatory, as they need to coordinate their actions in order to solve the level.

Game objects
 Block  Can be pushed around but cannot be shot.
 Converter  Changes laser beams into pushing beams and vice versa.
 Exchanger  When activated by the Grabber, switches places with it and vanishes. Deflects laser beams back to their source.
 Flag  Does nothing but fly in the wind and get in the way. Its only use is to be destroyed.
 Force up/down  When activated by the Grabber, moves all lifts not currently holding something either up or down.
 Freezer  When activated by the Grabber, temporarily freezes everything in the tower except the robots and the lifts. Once used, takes several seconds to recharge.
 Glass block  Can be pushed around. Shooting at it deflects the laser beam back to its source, destroying whoever shot at it.
 Hopper  Hops around in a random fashion. Can be destroyed by shooting it.
 Klondike  The robots' energy pack. Can be collected by the Grabber.
 Lizard  Constantly moves in a straight line. When changing direction, eats away a floor tile. Cannot be shot.
 Mine  When it is pushed next to an object, or an object is pushed next to it, it explodes, destroying everything it touches.
 Prism  Deflects laser beams at a 90° angle. Can be pushed.
 Pushing cannon  Constantly fires a pushing beam. Comes in two varieties, fixed and rotating. Cannot be shot.
 Time bomb  When the timer reaches zero, it explodes, destroying everything it touches. Can be pushed.
 Watcher  Moves around in a random fashion. Cannot be shot.
 Wiper  When activated by the Grabber, eats away all floor tiles in a cross-shaped pattern with itself at the centre.
 Worm  Constantly moves in a straight line. Shooting at it makes it reverse direction. When trapped, can be pushed sideways. Moving worms cannot be pushed.
 Zapping cannon  Constantly fires a lethal laser beam. Comes in two varieties, fixed and rotating. Can be destroyed by shooting it.

Legacy
Triogical is a Freeware puzzle game for Microsoft Windows inspired by Tower of Babel.

Due to its unique nature and the easily usable editor the game has acquired a small, but very dedicated community of fans. Thanks to emulation software like WinUAE the game can be played on modern PCs and homemade towers swapped via the Internet. Currently there is one remake in the making.

In July 2015, a remake for iPhone and iPad was released by Laser Point Software Ltd.

External links

Tower of Babel Remake Project and info at tower-of-babel.info

Homage page with the complete 7-page manual for the game
Tower of Babel remake for iPhone, iPad and Android

1989 video games
Acorn Archimedes games
Amiga games
Atari ST games
Europe-exclusive video games
Puzzle video games
Telecomsoft games
Video games developed in the United Kingdom